

The Novovoronezh nuclear power station ( []) is a nuclear power station close to Novovoronezh in Voronezh Oblast, central Russia. The power station was vital to the development of the VVER design: every unit built was essentially a prototype of its design. On this site is built the Novovoronezh Nuclear Power Plant II.

History
In 2002 Novovoronezh-3 was modernised and life extended, including new safety systems.

In 2010 Novovoronezh-5 was shut down for modernization to extend its operating life for an additional 25 years, the first VVER-1000 to undergo such an operating life extension. The works include the modernization of management, protection and emergency systems, and improvement of security and radiation safety systems.

As of 2018 unit 4 is undergoing modernisation work for a 15-year life extension, taking its operational life to 60 years. This involved annealing its reactor pressure vessel and using parts from the recently shutdown unit 3.

Reactor data 

The Novovoronezh Nuclear Power Plant has five units:

Gallery

See also

 Nuclear power in Russia

References

External links

Nuclear power stations built in the Soviet Union
Nuclear power stations in Russia
Buildings and structures in Voronezh Oblast
Nuclear power stations using VVER reactors
Cultural heritage monuments in Voronezh Oblast
Objects of cultural heritage of Russia of federal significance